Biester is a surname. Notable people with the surname include:

 Edward G. Biester Jr. (born 1931), American politician and judge
 Johann Erich Biester (1749–1816), German philosopher

See also
 Bester
 Riester